Sara Davies  (born 23 April 1984) is a British businesswoman, entrepreneur, and television personality. She is the founder and owner of Crafter's Companion, a company she started while a student at the University of York. In April 2019 it was announced that she would join the panel of the BBC television programme Dragons' Den for its seventeenth series, replacing Jenny Campbell who decided to leave the programme in early 2019. In 2021 Davies was appointed the North East Ambassador for Smart Works Newcastle, a charity supporting unemployed women into work through clothing and coaching.

Early life
Davies was born in Coundon, County Durham, England in 1984. She has a sister. She graduated from the University of York with a first class Business degree in 2006.

Career
Davies founded Crafter's Companion, a crafter's supply company, whilst at university in 2005. During a placement at a small craft company she spotted a gap in the market for a tool that could create bespoke envelopes for handmade cards and, with the aid of a local carpenter, designed a product called The Enveloper which she launched on the TV shopping channel Ideal World, selling 30,000 units within six months. By the time she graduated the business was turning over £500,000.

As of 2019, Crafter's Companion exports to more than 40 countries worldwide. The company has a UK headquarters in Newton Aycliffe, outlets in Evesham, Chesterfield and Colne, an office in Corona, California, and employs 200 people worldwide. In 2018 the turnover of Crafter's Companion was said to be nearly £25 million.

In her capacity as an entrepreneur, Davies helps women in business and offers support and guidance to businesses as part of her mentoring role with the Entrepreneurs' Forum.<ref>Manning, Jonathon "Crafter's Companion founder Sara Davies rewarded with MBE" The Northern Echo, 10 June 2016. Retrieved on 10 June 2016.</ref>

Television
In 2015, Davies hosted Local Television Limited's (formerly Made in Television) craft show, Be Creative. On 23 April 2019, she joined BBC Two's Dragons' Den as the show's youngest ever female investor. Speaking to the BBC, she said "I've been a fan of the show since it started. I was even invited to pitch on the show 13 years ago, so it feels like I’ve come a full circle."

From September 2021 Davies competed in the nineteenth series of Strictly Come Dancing where she was paired with Aljaž Škorjanec. They were eliminated in Week 8, after a dance-off with Tilly Ramsay and Nikita Kuzmin.

In 2023, Davies was seen on BBC Four walking around Healey and the Swinton Estate in North Yorkshire in Spring Walks, a new spin-off from Cy Chadwick's Yorkshire Walks/Walking with...'' format.

Awards and honours
Davies was appointed Member of the Order of the British Empire (MBE) in the 2016 New Year Honours for services to the economy.

Davies has been recognised with a number of awards for her work as an entrepreneur. In 2010 she was awarded the Ernst & Young Emerging Entrepreneur of the Year award, in 2013 she was presented with the Entrepreneur of the Year at the Shell Women of the Year Awards and she was listed in startups.co.uk’s Young Guns Entrepreneurs of the Year class of 2015. She has also been the recipient of two Lloyds Bank National Business Awards: the Santander Small to Medium Sized Business of the Year award in 2010 and the Outstanding Contribution to British Business Award in 2019.

Personal life
Davies married her husband Simon in September 2007. The couple have two sons and live in Teesside.

References

1984 births
Living people
21st-century English businesswomen
21st-century English businesspeople
Alumni of the University of York
Members of the Order of the British Empire
People from Coundon